Plenty may refer to:

Places
Plenty, Victoria, a town in Australia
Plenty River (Victoria), a river in the Australian state of Victoria
Plenty River (Northern Territory), a river in the Northern Territory of Australia
Plenty, Tasmania, a small locality and river in Australia
Plenty, Saskatchewan, a village in Canada
Bay of Plenty, in New Zealand
 Bay of Plenty Region, New Zealand
Cape Plenty, in the South Shetland Islands of Antarctica

Arts and entertainment
Plenty (play), by David Hare
Plenty (film), a 1985 film directed by Fred Schepisi, adapted from Hare's play
Plenty (band), a Japanese rock band
Plenty (album), a 2010 album by the English band Red Box
"Plenty", a song by Northlane from Obsidian
“Plenty”, a song by Sarah McLachlan from Fumbling Towards Ecstasy
Plenty O'Toole, a character in the 1971 James Bond film Diamonds Are Forever

Other uses
Plenty International, an outreach program
Plenty: One Man, One Woman, and a Raucous Year of Eating Locally, the alternate name of the non-fiction book The 100-Mile Diet
The translated name of Sūrat al-Kawthar in the Quran
Plenty (brand), a brand of paper towel sold in the UK
Plenty Highway, in Australia